Beltar may refer to:

Beltar, Nepal
Beltar (Dungeons & Dragons), a lesser deity in the Greyhawk setting of the Dungeons & Dragons game